Ukraine is an Eastern European country.

Ukraine, Ukraina or Ukrayina may also refer to:
 before 20 century borderland region in Polish–Lithuanian Commonwealth (later in Russian Partition and Austrian Partition)
 Ukrainian People's Republic or Ukrainian National Republic, independent state proclaimed after breakup of the Russian Empire
 Ukrainian State, a government that existed on most of the territory of Ukraine in 1918
 Ukrainian Soviet Socialist Republic, one of the former constituent republics of the Soviet Union, until becoming independent in 1991.
 Reichskommissariat Ukraine, civilian occupation regime of German-occupied Ukraine during World War II
 Ukraine, (formerly Fuentes de Andalucía), a town in Spain that changed its name in 2022 in honour of the country.
 2022 Russian invasion of Ukraine

Other meanings, in alphabetical order:

 1709 Ukraina, a main-belt asteroid
 Hotel Ukraina, Moscow, a hotel in Moscow, Russia
 Hotel Ukraine, a hotel in Kyiv, Ukraine
 Palace "Ukraine", theatre venue for official events in Kyiv
 Rise up, Ukraine!, series of political protests by opposition parties in Ukraine during 2013
 Ukraina-class motorship, a 1979 class of Russian ships
 Ukraina, Lesser Poland Voivodeship, another village in Poland
 Ukraina, Łódź Voivodeship, a village in Poland
 Ukraina (ship), named Bulgaria since 2010
 Ukraina Stadium, multi-purpose stadium in Lviv, Ukraine
 Ukraine Air Enterprise, based in Kyiv
 Ukraine – Forward!, political party in Ukraine
 Ukraine (TV channel)
 The Voice of Ukraine, a Ukrainian talent show

See also

 Ukraina (disambiguation)
 Ukrainia (disambiguation)
 Ukrainian (disambiguation)
 Ukrainians (disambiguation)
 Carpathian Ukraine (disambiguation)
 Name of Ukraine